Vieugué Island is an island  long at the west side of Grandidier Channel, lying  northwest of Duchaylard Island and  west-northwest of Cape Garcia, off the west coast of Graham Land. Discovered by the French Antarctic Expedition, 1903–05, and named by Charcot after Monsieur Vieugue, then French Charge d'Affaires at Buenos Aires.

See also 
 List of Antarctic and sub-Antarctic islands

Islands of Graham Land
Graham Coast